This is a list of rulers of Hesse during the history of Hesse on west-central Germany. These rulers belonged to a dynasty collectively known as the House of Hesse and the House of Brabant, originally the Reginar. Hesse was ruled as a landgraviate, electorate and later as a grand duchy until 1918.

The title of all of the following rulers was "landgrave" unless otherwise noted.

Landgraviate of Hesse

In the early Middle Ages the Hessengau territory (named after the Germanic Chatti tribes) formed the northern parts of the German stem duchy of Franconia along with the adjacent Lahngau. Upon the extinction of the ducal Conradines, these Rhenish Franconian counties were gradually acquired by Landgrave Louis I of Thuringia and his successors.

After the War of the Thuringian Succession upon the death of Landgrave Henry Raspe in 1247, his niece Duchess Sophia of Brabant secured the Hessian possessions for her minor son Henry the Child, who would become the first landgrave of Hesse and founder of the House of Hesse in 1246. The remaining Thuringian landgraviate fell to the Wettin margrave Henry III of Meissen. Henry I of Hesse was raised to princely status by King Adolf of Germany in 1292.

Landgraves of Hesse

House of Hesse

Partitions of Hesse under Hesse family

Table of rulers

Heads of the non-reigning House of Hesse

Hesse-Kassel since 1866

Friedrich Wilhelm I, the former Elector, titular Landgrave 1866–75 (1802–1875)
succeeded by his second cousin Friedrich Wilhelm II as below:

 Friedrich II, Landgrave of Hesse-Kassel (1720–1785)
  Friedrich III, Landgrave of Hesse-Kassel-Rumpenheim (1747–1837)
  Wilhelm I, Landgrave of Hesse-Kassel-Rumpenheim (1787–1867)
  Friedrich Wilhelm II, titular Landgrave 1875–84 (1820–1884)
 Friedrich Wilhelm III, titular Landgrave 1884–88 (1854–1888)
 Alexander Friedrich, titular Landgrave 1888–1925, abdicated (1863–1945)
  Friedrich Karl, titular Landgrave 1925–40, elected King of Finland as Fredrik Kaarle I in 1918 but renounced the throne (1868–1940)
 Philipp, titular Landgrave 1940–80, head of entire House 1968 on extinction of Hesse-Darmstadt line (1896–1980)
  Moritz, titular Landgrave and Head of House 1980–2013 (1926–2013)
 Heinrich Donatus titular Landgrave and Head of House 2013–present (born 1966)
 Moritz, Hereditary Prince of Hesse (born 2007)
  Prince August of Hesse (born 2012)
  Prince Philipp Robin of Hesse (born 1970)
  Prince Tito of Hesse (born 2008)
  Prince Christoph of Hesse (1901–1943)
 Prince Karl Adolf Andreas of Hesse (1937–2022)
  Prince Christoph of Hesse (born 1969)
  Prince Rainer Christoph Friedrich of Hesse (born 1939)

Hesse-Philippsthal 1866–1925

 Charles II, formerly sovereign, titular Landgrave 1866–68 (1803–1868)
  Ernst Eugen, titular Landgrave 1868–1925 (1846–1925)

1925 the Line of Hesse-Philippsthal became extinct, passed to Hesse-Philippsthal-Barchfeld

Hesse-Philippsthal-Barchfeld since 1866, Hesse-Philippsthal since the extinction of the main line 1925

  Charles, Landgrave of Hesse-Philippsthal-Barchfeld (1784–1854)
 Alexis, formerly sovereign, titular Landgrave 1866–1905 (1829–1905)
  Prince Wilhelm of Hesse-Philippsthal-Barchfeld (1831–1890)
  Chlodwig, titular Landgrave 1905–54, inherited Hesse-Philippsthal as well in 1925 (1876–1954)
  Prince Wilhelm of Hesse-Philippsthal-Barchfeld (1905–1942)
 Wilhelm, titular Landgrave 1954–present (born 1933)
 Prince Wilhelm of Hesse-Philippsthal-Barchfeld (born 1963)
 Prince Wilhelm Ernst of Hesse-Philippsthal-Barchfeld (born 2005)
  Prince Philipp August of Hesse-Philippsthal-Barchfeld (born 2006)
  Prince Otto of Hesse-Philippsthal-Barchfeld (1965–2020)
 Prince Max of Hesse-Philippsthal-Barchfeld (born 1999)
  Prince Moritz of Hesse-Philippsthal-Barchfeld (born 2007)
  Prince Hermann of Hesse-Philippsthal-Barchfeld (1935–2019)
  Prince Alexis of Hesse-Philippsthal-Barchfeld (born 1977)

Hesse-Darmstadt 1918–1968

 Ernst Ludwig, formerly sovereign, titular Grand Duke 1918–37 (1868–1937)
 George Donatus, titular Grand Duke 9 Oct – 16 Nov 1937
  Ludwig (V), titular Grand Duke 1937–1968

In 1968 the Line of Hesse-Darmstadt became Hesse-Nassau and Hesse-Kassel (1969–present)

See also
 House of Hesse
 History of Hesse
 Coat of arms of Hesse

References

External links
 The History Files: Rulers of Hesse
 

Rulers of Hesse
Hesse
Hessian rulers
History of Hesse